Sing Tao Chinese Radio is the radio division of the Sing Tao News Corporation in the San Francisco Bay Area. It currently leases time from KVTO (1400 AM) and KSQQ (96.1 FM).

History
Sing Tao Chinese Radio began broadcasting in Cantonese on KEST (1450 AM) on April 8, 1996, and on KVTO on June 2, 1997. As of 2016, KVTO carries Sing Tao's programs on weekdays from 7 am to 2 pm and from 4 pm to 7 pm, and 12 noon to 2pm Saturday and Sunday.

Mandarin broadcasts began on March 3, 1997. As of 2016, KSQQ carries Sing Tao's programs on weekdays from 7 am to 1 pm to the Mandarin-speaking population which is concentrated in the South Bay area.

Singtao Chinese Radio began to cease Cantonese broadcasts from KEST 1450 AM in July 2005 and it currently has only one Cantonese broadcasting station on KVTO 1400 AM.

Location
Broadcast studios are located in the Sing Tao Daily newspaper building in South San Francisco.

External links
 Sing Tao Chinese Radio Website

Cantonese-language radio stations
Chinese-American culture in California
Mandarin-language radio stations